American country music duo The Judds released six studio albums, three live albums, 18 compilation albums, five video albums, two extended plays, one box set, five music videos, 29 singles and 1 album appearance. The duo consisted of mother, Naomi Judd, and her daughter, Wynonna Judd. The pair signed a recording contract with RCA Nashville in 1983. Later that year, their debut single was released called "Had a Dream (For the Heart)". Their next release, "Mama He's Crazy", became their first number one hit on the Billboard Hot Country Singles & Tracks chart. The song's success led to the release of their debut EP in 1984. It peaked at number eight on the Billboard Top Country Albums chart. In October 1984, their debut studio album was released entitled Why Not Me. It peaked at number one on the country albums chart and number 71 on the Billboard 200. Why Not Me would sell over two million copies. It also spawned three number one country hits: the title track, "Girls' Night Out" and "Love Is Alive".

The duo's second studio album was issued in October 1985, Rockin' with the Rhythm. It topped the Billboard country albums chart and spawned four number one hits. These hits included "Have Mercy" and "Grandpa (Tell Me 'Bout the Good Old Days)". The Judds's third studio release, Heartland, was released in 1987 and was their third number one Billboard country album. Heartland was also their third album to certify platinum in sales in the United States. The album produced four singles, three of which were number one country hits. In 1988, the duo released their first greatest hits package. It also included two new tracks that became hits. Their fifth studio release, River of Time (1989), reached number two on the country albums chart and was their highest-charting release on the Billboard 200, reaching number 51. The album's first two singles reached number one on the country chart.

In 1990, Naomi announced her retirement after being diagnosed with Hepatitis C. Their final studio album, Love Can Build a Bridge, was released the same year and produced four singles. This included the top ten hits "Born to Be Blue", "One Hundred and Two" and the title track. The album itself reached number five on the Billboard country albums chart by March 1991 and certified platinum in the United States. With the release of a second greatest hits package, the group disbanded in 1991. Wynonna created a successful solo career and Naomi's health improved enough for the duo to reunite in 2000 with a live album. Its success led to the release of the extended play, Big Bang Boogie, in 2000. Announcing their final tour in 2011, the duo released the compilation, I Will Stand by You: The Essential Collection, which included two new tracks.

Albums

Studio albums

Compilation albums

Live albums

Box sets

Extended plays

Singles

Videography

Video albums

Music videos

Other album appearances

See also
Wynonna Judd discography

Notes

References

External links
 The Judds discography at Wynonna Judd's official website

Country music discographies
Discographies of American artists
Discography